Philippus of Thessalonica (Greek:Φίλιππος ὁ Θεσσαλονικεύς) (1st century) or Philippus Epigrammaticus  was the compiler of an Anthology of Epigrammatists subsequent to Meleager of Gadara and is himself the author of 72 epigrams in the Greek Anthology. Philippus has one word which describes the epigram by a single quality; he calls his work an oligostikhia or collection of poems not exceeding a few lines in length. Philippus' own epigrams, of which over seventy are extant, are generally rather dull, chiefly school exercises, and, in the phrase of Jacobs, imitatione magis quam inventione conspicua (more like imitation than striking innovation). But we owe to him the preservation of a large mass of work belonging to the Roman period.

His collection of epigrams is referred to as the Garland of Philip, in imitation of the Garland of Meleager, who lived in the first century BC and had collected epigrams from the Classical and Hellenistic period.

References
About.com
Ancient Library
Select Epigrams from the Greek Anthology by J. W. Mackail

Anthologists
Ancient Roman poets
Roman-era Thessalonians
Ancient Macedonian poets
Ancient Macedonian anthologists
Ancient Greek anthologists
Epigrammatists of the Greek Anthology
1st-century Greek poets